Nick Forbes  (born 8 November 1973) is a British Labour politician who served as the leader of Newcastle City Council between 2011 and 2022. He was a councillor for Arthur's Hill between 2018 and 2022, and previous to that for the Westgate and Moorside areas of Newcastle. 

He was the leader of Labour Group on the Local Government Association, the national membership body for local authorities. Forbes also served as the LGA's Senior Vice Chair.  

He was the leader of the Labour group on Newcastle City Council from 2007 until March 2022. As a result of being deselected by the Labour branch in his Arthur's Hill seat ahead of the 2022 council election, Forbes stepped down as Labour group leader. He stepped down as leader of the city council on 5 May 2022. Nick Kemp has replaced him as the Labour leader in the city.

Early life 
Nick Forbes was born on 8 November 1973. He attended Wolsingham Comprehensive School in Weardale, County Durham, before studying social and political sciences at Selwyn College, Cambridge, where he obtained an upper second class honours degree. He later studied for a management diploma from Sheffield Hallam University, and a master's degree in Music from the Open University.

Political career 
Nick Forbes became a councillor in May 2000, representing the Westgate part of the city, and went on to become leader of the Labour group in May 2007. In 2011, he became leader of the council following the 2011 local elections which saw the Liberal Democrats suffer heavy losses across the city, as well as nationally. He has been an extensive critic of the government's fiscal policy of cuts in funding to local government, and defended a policy of particularly cutting arts funding in the city in response. Forbes is critical of Universal Credit.

In February 2016, Forbes succeeded Jim McMahon as Labour’s leader of the Local Government Association. According to the LGA's website, Forbes "has played a leading role in raising the profile of local government in a time of austerity made economic growth a key feature of his council, securing new financial powers by negotiating one of the first round of City Deals with government. He has worked with leaders from across England to secure devolution packages for local government."

In 2019, Forbes unsuccessfully sought selection to be Labour's candidate in the 2019 North of Tyne mayoral election, losing to Jamie Driscoll.

He is openly gay and a patron of LGBT+ Labour.

Honours 
Forbes was made a Commander of the Order of the British Empire (CBE) in the 2019 New Year Honours for services to local government.

References

External links
 
Authored articles for The Guardian

1973 births
Alumni of the Open University
Alumni of Sheffield Hallam University
Alumni of Selwyn College, Cambridge
Commanders of the Order of the British Empire
Councillors in Newcastle upon Tyne
Labour Party (UK) councillors
Living people
Politicians from Newcastle upon Tyne
Leaders of local authorities of England
English LGBT politicians